No Absolute Time is an album by French jazz fusion artist Jean-Luc Ponty, released in 1993. It marks his return to the Atlantic label.

Track listing 
All songs by Jean-Luc Ponty.
 "No Absolute Time" – 5:42
 "Savannah" – 9:18
 "Lost Illusions" – 5:03
 "Dance of the Spirits" – 4:59
 "Forever Together" – 5:46
 "Caracas" – 3:53
 "The African Spirit" – 4:58
 "Speak Out" – 6:23
 "Blue Mambo" – 6:12
 "The Child in You" – 4:33

Personnel 
Jean-Luc Ponty – violin, keyboards, electric violin and viola, synthesizer
Martin Atangana – guitar
Kevin Eubanks – guitar (on "Blue Mambo")
Guy N'Sangue – bass, sound effects
Moustapha Cisse – percussion
Kémo Kouyaté – harp, background vocals, Balafon, Kora
Abdou M'Boup – percussion, drums, sound effects, tambourine, bells, shaker, cowbell, bougarabou drums
Mokhtar Samba – percussion, drums, timbales, cowbell, doundoumba, bougarabou drums
Sydney Thiam – percussion, sound effects, bells, shaker, doundoumba
Wally Minko – piano, keyboards
Production notes
Jean-Luc Ponty – producer
Eduardo Chermont – engineer
Steve Harrison – engineer
Peter Kelsey – engineer
Patrice Lazareff – engineer
Bernie Grundman – mastering

Charts

References 

1993 albums
Jean-Luc Ponty albums
Atlantic Records albums